Chowchilla Union High School is a public high school located in Chowchilla, California. It is within the Chowchilla Union High School District.

Statistics

Demographics 
In the 2016–2017 school year, the high school had a total of 1,051 students enrolled.

Notable alumni 
Morris Owens, former NFL wide receiver for the Miami Dolphins and the Tampa Bay Buccaneers

References

External links 
 Chowchilla Union High School District

Public high schools in California
High schools in Madera County, California